Proboscidea is a genus of flowering plant in the family Martyniaceae, some of whose species are known as devil's claw, devil's horn, ram's horn, or unicorn plant. The plants produce long, hooked seed pods. The hooks catch on the feet of animals, and as the animals walk, the pods are ground or crushed open, dispersing the seeds. The name devil's claw is shared with the South African plant Harpagophytum procumbens.

Uses

The fruits of all species are edible before they ripen and become woody. They can be steamed and eaten much like okra. Some species (particularly P. parviflora) are used in basket weaving by the Tohono O'odham who have selected for varieties with longer "claws." The Chemehuevi also use devil's claw pods in basketry. The Hia C-eḍ Oʼodham and the Tohono O'odham eat the seeds, which provided an important source of dietary oils. P. parviflora was also used as a remedy for rheumatism.

Species
Species include:
 Proboscidea althaeifolia - devil's horn, devil's claw, or desert unicorn plant
 Proboscidea louisianica - ram's horn
 Proboscidea parviflora - doubleclaw, (red) devil's claw
 Proboscidea sabulosa - dune unicorn plant
 Proboscidea spicata - New Mexico unicorn plant

Proboscidea lutea is a synonym of Ibicella lutea.

References

External links
 USDA Image Gallery

Martyniaceae
Lamiales genera